The Walther WA 2000 is a semi-automatic bullpup sniper rifle produced by the Carl Walther GmbH Sportwaffen company from 1982 until 1988. It was produced in three different calibers. Production of the rifle was limited and it was shortly stopped because it was too expensive to achieve widespread sales and not robust enough for military use as a sniper rifle. Only 176 were built due to its high cost, making it one of the rarest and most sought production firearms ever made.

Design
The WA 2000 was designed in the late 1970s and early 1980s, in response to the 1972 Summer Olympics Munich massacre. The bullpup design was chosen because it would allow a standard length barrel to be used whilst the overall length would be shorter than a conventional rifle. The rifle did not have iron sights. The most commonly used optical sight was a Schmidt & Bender 2.5–10× telescopic sight.

The .300 Winchester Magnum round was chosen as the primary caliber because of its long range accuracy and its consistency at all ranges. The entire rifle is designed around the barrel. The WA 2000 fires from a closed bolt and uses a bolt with seven locking lugs. It has either a single-stage trigger or a two-stage trigger with a trigger pull of 1.2 to 1.4 kg (2.65 to 3.1 lb). The rifle uses single stack box magazines with a 6-round capacity, which weigh  when loaded.

Variants

The WA 2000 is chambered in .300 Winchester Magnum, 7.62×51mm NATO, and 7.5×55mm Swiss.

Only 176 total rifles were produced, and in two different variants. The two variants can be differentiated by the type of flash suppressor used: the first, the older model, uses a "can" type flash suppressor; whereas the second generation and newer model uses the more conventional "flash-hider/compensator" design. The second generation incorporated several changes improving the rifle's accuracy, making it more suited to its intended job.

Production
The rifle was produced from 1982 until November 1988. The rifle was used by some German police units, but production was stopped because it was too expensive to achieve widespread sales. It was never adopted by a military unit due to its cost and not being robust enough for field service. The final retail cost for a base rifle in the 1980s was in the range of $9,000 to $12,500, and the rifle's current value ranges from $40,000 for the first generation to $75,000 for the second generation.

See also
List of bullpup firearms
List of sniper rifles

References

External links

7.62×51mm NATO semi-automatic rifles
Bullpup rifles
Semi-automatic rifles
Sniper rifles of Germany
Cold War weapons of Germany